Naluwere is a parish in Bulidha subcounty of  Bukooli North County in Bugiri District of Uganda. At the time of the 2014 census it had   3821 inhabitants.

References

Populated places in Eastern Region, Uganda
Bugiri District